was a Japanese international legal scholar. He served as the 3rd Chief Justice of Japan from 1960 to 1966. He graduated from the Tokyo Imperial University and later served on its faculty. He received the Degree of Doctor of Law (Tokyo Imperial University). He was a recipient of the Order of Culture and the Order of the Rising Sun. His grave is in 	
Gokoku-ji Temple Cemetery, Bunkyō-ku, Tokyo

References

1896 births
1993 deaths
International law scholars
Chief justices of Japan
Supreme Court of Japan justices
Japanese judges
Academic staff of the University of Tokyo
Recipients of the Order of Culture
Recipients of the Order of the Rising Sun with Paulownia Flowers
Grand Cordons of the Order of the Rising Sun
University of Tokyo alumni
Members of the International Law Commission